Caña may refer to:

 Sugarcane or other canes
 a general term for rum, or any hard liquor from sugar
 Caña (Chilean slang), a hangover
 Caña blanca, a white rum from a sugar and molasses mixture, without dark molasses or caramel, without oak ageing
 a nickname for Orujo, hard liquor from grape pressings (pomace)
 La Caña, a district of Los Ríos, Distrito Nacional, Dominican Republic
 Potrero de Caña, a corregimiento in Tolé District, Chiriquí Province, Panama
 Caña (flamenco), a musical form similar to the polo
 Kelvin Caña (born 1987), Venezuelan épée fencer
 Another name for the Baston, a martial arts weapon

See also
 Flor de Caña (disambiguation)
 Cana (disambiguation)
 
 Cañita (disambiguation)